Luoyang Glass Company Limited or Luoyang Glass is a state-owned enterprise in Luoyang, Henan, China, which is involved with the production and sales of float sheet and flat glass and reprocessing of automobile glass.

History
Luoyang Glass was established in 1994 by its parent company, China Luoyang Float Glass Group. Its H shares were listed on the Hong Kong Stock Exchange in 1994, while its A shares were listed on the Shanghai Stock Exchange in 1995.

References

External links
Luoyang Glass Company Limited
China Luoyang Float Glass Group Company Limited

Companies listed on the Hong Kong Stock Exchange
Companies listed on the Shanghai Stock Exchange
Government-owned companies of China
Glassmaking companies of China
Manufacturing companies established in 1994
Companies based in Henan
Manufacturing companies of China
Chinese brands
H shares
Luoyang
Chinese companies established in 1994